Agrisius fuliginosus is a moth of the subfamily Arctiinae. It is found in Japan, China and India.

References

Moths described in 1872
Lithosiini
Moths of Japan
Moths of Asia